Oleg Yermolin (born 18 February 1972) is a Russian luger. He competed in the men's singles event at the 1992 Winter Olympics.

References

External links
 

1972 births
Living people
Russian male lugers
Olympic lugers of the Unified Team
Lugers at the 1992 Winter Olympics
People from Bratsk
Sportspeople from Irkutsk Oblast